Blackwood High School is a co-educational secondary school located in Eden Hills, a south-eastern suburb of Adelaide, South Australia, offering an international baccalaureate middle-years programme with six nearby primary schools and diploma programme as the "Mitcham Hills College". It is also a special-interest high school that specialises in netball. Blackwood High also offers an enrichment program for identified "gifted" or "talented" students.

Primary schools involved in the Mitcham Hills College are:
Belair Primary Schools
Bellevue Heights Primary School
Blackwood Primary School
Coromandel Valley Primary School
Eden Hills Primary School
Hawthorndene Primary School

The school developed a resource with Sturt Police on "Teenage Parties" that has been adapted by Victorian private schools Scotch College and Toorak College. The Adelaide-based hip hop group Hilltop Hoods formed at Blackwood High School. The school also has a canteen, and is the site of the Blackwood Community Recreation Centre.

As of 2022, the school has adopted a rule which bans students from using their mobile phone during school hours. This has been met with a lot of criticism from both students and parents as it makes it a lot harder to communicate with each other.

Performing Arts Centre
The Performing Arts Centre (PAC), the Auditorium, or the Blackwood Community Recreation Centre, was constructed in 2001 with funds raised in several schools and community-based fund-raisers. It features several sound-proofed rooms, computing equipment, musical instruments, and a large theatre and stage, with a booth for controlling the lighting and sound effects. The PAC is also used by the community as a church on Sunday mornings.

The main auditorium seats about 350, with the capability to have an extended stage because of retractable seating. In addition to the main performing areas, the PAC boasts a recording studio, four small practise rooms, two classrooms, offices, and storerooms.

Notable alumni 
 David James Campbell, writer and film director
Chloë Fox, South Australia MP in the South Australian House of Assembly
Rebecca Morse, newsreader for Channel 10, South Australia
Peter Rathjen, medical researcher, Rhodes scholar, and sexual abuser
Terence Tao, mathematician and 2006 recipient of the Fields Medal
Musicians
Julian Cochran (composer)
Beccy Cole (musician)
Matt Lambert (Suffa) and Dan Smith (Pressure) of the Hilltop Hoods
Nathan Leigh Jones (musician)
Sports people:
Adam Cooney, 2008 Brownlow Medal winner, AFL, Western Bulldogs and Essendon
Peter Motley, Australian Rules footballer - Sturt Football Club 1982–1985 and Carlton Football Club 1986–87
Matthew Nicks, Australian Rules footballer - West Adelaide and Sydney Swans 1996–2005
Kerri Pottharst, Australian professional beach volleyball player and Olympic gold medalist
Bianca Reddy, netballer for the Adelaide Thunderbirds
Liam Reddy, soccer player in the National Soccer League (Parramatta Power, Sydney United), the A-League (Newcastle Jets, Brisbane Roar, Wellington Phoenix, Sydney, Central Coast Mariners, Western Sydney Wanderers, Perth Glory), and Persian Gulf Pro League (Esteghlal)
Joel Reddy, National Rugby League player -South Sydney Rabbitohs, Wests, and Parramatta
Ben Rutten, former Australian Rules footballer - Adelaide Football Club 2003–2014 All-Australian selection in 2005
Matthew Powell, former Australian Rules footballer - Adelaide Football Club 1993–1995

School publications 
Each year, the school's year 11 students compile a yearbook, which has, since its beginnings, been entitled Cambium. Students contribute articles, photographs, artworks, and written works, which give a snapshot of the school year.

References

External links
Blackwood High School
International Baccalaureate Organization listing for Blackwood High School
Blackwood Community Recreation Centre

Public schools in South Australia
International Baccalaureate schools in Australia
Special interest high schools in South Australia
1961 establishments in Australia
Educational institutions established in 1961
Secondary schools in Adelaide
High schools in South Australia